It's Your Fault is a 2010 Argentine drama film directed by Anahí Berneri.

Cast 
 Érica Rivas as Julieta
 Nicasio Galán as Teo
 Zenón Galán as Valentín
 Rubén Viani as Guillermo
 Marta Bianchi- Abuela
 Osmar Núñez as Doctor

References

External links 

2010 drama films
2010 films
Argentine drama films
2010s Argentine films
2010s Spanish-language films